Didemnum fragile is a species of sea squirt in the family Didemnidae.

Research 
Didemnum fragile is of medical interest as it contains shishijimicin molecules, which have been seen to have potent anti-tumor activity in HeLa cells at picomolar concentrations. Shishijimicin A was recently synthesized.

References 

Enterogona
Animals described in 1981